Kirawsk District (Kirovsky raion) is a raion (district) in Mogilev Region, Belarus, the administrative center is the town of Kirawsk. As of 2009, its population was 22,352. Population of Kirawsk accounts for 39.2% of the district's population.

Two major Belarusian automobile roads pass through the raion: P93 and M5 (European route E271).

References

 
Districts of Mogilev Region